Eupithecia atacamaensis is a moth in the family Geometridae. It is found in the regions of Atacama (Huasco Province) and Coquimbo (El Qui Province) in Chile. The habitat consists of the Intermediate Desert and Coquimban Desert Biotic Provinces.

The length of the forewings is about 8.5 mm for males and 8.5–9 mm for females. The forewings are whitish grey with medium, dark, and reddish brown scaling. The hindwings are paler than the forewings, with scattered brown scaling distally. Adults have been recorded on wing in October and February.

Etymology
The specific name is derived from the type locality.

References

Moths described in 1987
atacamaensis
Moths of South America
Endemic fauna of Chile